John R. Calhoun was a merchant and political figure on Prince Edward Island. He represented 4th Prince in the Legislative Assembly of Prince Edward Island from 1876 to 1879 as a Liberal.

Born in New Brunswick, Calhoun spent most of his life in Summerside. He owned a general store and operated a sawmill and warehouse there. Calhoun was a member of the town board for Summerside from 1875 to 1877.

References 
 

Prince Edward Island Liberal Party MLAs
Year of birth missing
1898 deaths
Prince Edward Island municipal councillors
People from Summerside, Prince Edward Island